Labeo trigliceps is a species of ray-finned fish in the family Cyprinidae.
It is found only in the Athi River in Kenya.
Its natural habitat is rivers. Its taxonomic status is uncertain and the specimens taken so far may be aberrant specimens of Labeo cylindricus.

References

Labeo
Taxa named by Jacques Pellegrin
Fish described in 1926
Taxonomy articles created by Polbot